DDIS may refer to:

 Directorate of Defence Intelligence and Security, New Zealander intelligence agency
 Danish Defence Intelligence Service, Danish foreign and military intelligence agency